649 was a common year in the Julian calendar.

649 may also refer to:

 649 (number)
 Lotto 6/49, a lottery operated in Canada